William Arthur John West was a boxer, a first-class cricketer and Test match umpire.

Cricket
West played in five first-class matches for Marylebone Cricket Club, scoring 182 runs at 26 with a highest score of 74 against Lancashire. A right arm quick bowler, he also took five wickets at just 20 apiece. He stood in the match between North and South in 1890 and continued to umpire for the next 45 years, until his final season in 1935. He officiated in nine Test matches, from his first England v Australia test in 1896 to the 1912 Triangular Tournament featuring England, Australia and South Africa.

Boxing
West won the Amateur Boxing Association 1885 heavyweight title, when boxing out of the Northampton ABC.

References

1862 births
English Test cricket umpires
Marylebone Cricket Club cricketers
1938 deaths
English cricketers